The 1965 Prague Skate was a senior international figure skating competition held in Czechoslovakia in November 1965. Medals were awarded in the disciplines of men's singles, ladies' singles, pair skating, and ice dancing. Italy's Giordano Abbondati won the men's title ahead of the future Olympic champion, Ondrej Nepela of Czechoslovakia. Future Olympic medalist Hana Mašková took gold in the ladies' event by defeating Hungary's Zsuzsa Almássy and West Germany's Uschi Keszler. In ice dancing, Czechoslovakia's Jitka Babická / Jaromír Holan won the first of their two Prague Skate titles, defeating teams from West Germany and the United Kingdom.

Men

Ladies

Pairs

Ice dancing

References

Prague Skate
Prague Skate